Celu Amberstone (born 1947), sometimes seen as Celu Amberston, is a Canadian writer of fantasy and science fiction.

Early life and education
Celu Amberstone is of Cherokee and Scots-Irish ancestry. She is blind, from prenatal exposure to rubella. She holds a bachelor's degree in cultural anthropology and a master's degree in health education.

Career
Books by Amberstone include Blessings of the Blood: A Book of Menstrual Lore and Rituals for Women (1991), Deepening the Power: Community Ritual and Sacred Theatre (Beach Holme Publishing 1995), and The Dreamer's Legacy (Kegedonce Press 2012). Her short story "Refugees" appears in So Long Been Dreaming: Postcolonial Science Fiction and Fantasy (2004), edited by Nalo Hopkinson and Uppinder Mehan. "Refugees" was also excerpted in Walking the Clouds: An Anthology of Indigenous Science Fiction (2012), edited by Grace L. Dillon. The story has been the subject of several scholarly articles, as an example of Indigenous Futurism, including the lecture "Early America through the Lens of Science Fiction" by Laura M. Stevens of the University of Tulsa at her lecture in Obama Institute for Transnational American Studies, Johannes Gutenberg University Mainz, Germany.

Personal life
Amberstone lives in Victoria, British Columbia.

References

External links
 
 Celu Amberstone at the Kegedonce Press website.

1947 births
Canadian women short story writers
Canadian fantasy writers
Canadian science fiction writers
Blind writers
Date of birth missing (living people)
Living people
21st-century Canadian short story writers
21st-century Canadian novelists
Canadian women non-fiction writers
21st-century Canadian non-fiction writers